Jackson South is a rural locality in the Maranoa Region, Queensland, Australia.

History 
The locality takes its name from the neighbouring town of Jackson, which was named after John Woodward Wyndham Jackson who was a pioneer settler in the district.

Road infrastructure
The Warrego Highway runs along the northern boundary.

References 

Maranoa Region
Localities in Queensland